Vong Savang (27 September 1931 – 2 May 1978) was the Crown Prince to throne of the Kingdom of Laos. After the Laotian Civil War in 1975, he and his family were arrested by the Pathet Lao and sent to re-education camps, where they died.

Early life
He was born on 27 September 1931, at the Royal Palace Luang Prabang, Laos to King Savang Vatthana and Queen Khamphoui. He was educated at Montpellier University and later École sciences et politiques in Paris. He became the Crown Prince (Anga Mahkuta Raja Kumara) on 29 October 1962, and married Princess Mahneelai Panya (born 29 December 1941) on 4 August 1962. They had four sons and three daughters.

Death
Having read the royal rescript of abdication of his father on 2 December 1975, he lived in a private residence with his family until 1977, when they were arrested and taken to northern Laos and placed in a re-education camp. He reportedly died there on 2 May 1978.

Issue
The children of Vong Savang and Mahneelai are:

Honours

National
 Knight Grand Cross of the Order of the Million Elephants and the White Parasol.
 Medal of the Reign of King Sisavang Vong, 1st class.
 Medal of the Reign of King Savang Vatthana, 1st class.

Foreign
  : Knight Grand Cordon of the Supreme Order of the Chrysanthemum (April 1965). 
  : Knight Grand Cross of the Royal Order of Cambodia.
  : King Birendra Coronation Medal (24 February 1975).
  : King Rama IX Royal Cypher Medal, First Class (13 July 1962).

References

External links

Laos – "seminar Camps" And The Death Of King Savang Vatthana
Photographs of Royal Family of Laos

1931 births
Missing people
Heirs apparent who never acceded
Laotian royalty
Pretenders to the Laotian throne
Murdered royalty
1978 deaths
Sons of kings